William Thomas Romanowski (born April 2, 1966) is a former American football linebacker who played in the National Football League (NFL) for 16 seasons. Nicknamed "Romo" and "RomoCop", he spent the majority of his career with the San Francisco 49ers and Denver Broncos. Romanowski was selected by the 49ers in the third round of the 1988 NFL Draft and played six seasons each in San Francisco and Denver. He was also a member of the Philadelphia Eagles and Oakland Raiders for two seasons each. At the time of his retirement, Romanowski won four Super Bowl titles, two each with the 49ers and Broncos, and twice received Pro Bowl honors during his Broncos tenure. He also led a controversial career due to often engaging in unsportsmanlike behavior, which resulted in altercations with opponents and teammates.

Early life and education 
Romanowski was born in Vernon, Connecticut. He graduated from Rockville High School in 1984 and Boston College in 1988 with academic honors, and was a Scanlan Award recipient.

NFL career 

Romanowski went on to a 16-year career in the NFL, playing for the San Francisco 49ers (1988–1993), Philadelphia Eagles (1994–1995), Denver Broncos (1996–2001), and Oakland Raiders (2002–2003). After his career, he was listed by ESPN as the fifth dirtiest player in professional team sports history.

Romanowski played 243 consecutive games during the 1988-2003 seasons, an NFL record  that stood until Chris Gardocki broke it during the 2006 season, finishing his career with 265, (256 reg. season and 9 playoff games). He won four Super Bowl Championships, and played in five Super Bowls (Super Bowl XXIII, Super Bowl XXIV, Super Bowl XXXII, Super Bowl XXXIII and Super Bowl XXXVII). His only loss was in the lattermost.

During his 16-year career, Romanowski compiled 1,105 tackles, 39.5 sacks, 18 forced fumbles, and 18 interceptions, which he returned for a net total of 98 yards and 1 career touchdown. Romanowski was a Pro Bowl selection twice, in 1996 and 1998, both during his tenure with the Denver Broncos.

Altercations 
Romanowski was involved in numerous altercations with both teammates and opponents. In 1995, while with the Eagles, he was ejected from a game — and subsequently fined $4,500 — for kicking Arizona Cardinals fullback Larry Centers in the head.

Two more incidents occurred during the 1997 season while he played for the Broncos. In the first, he was fined $20,000 after a helmet-to-helmet hit on then-Carolina Panthers quarterback Kerry Collins in a preseason game resulting in Collins sustaining a broken jaw.

In the second incident, Romanowski spat in the face of 49ers wide receiver J. J. Stokes in a regular-season game played in December on a Monday night in response to Stokes' taunting.

Two years later, while still with the Broncos, he was fined a total of $42,500 for three illegal hits plus a punch thrown at Kansas City Chiefs tight end Tony Gonzalez, and was also fined an undisclosed amount for throwing a football at Bryan Cox of the New York Jets, the ball hitting him in the crotch area.

Marcus Williams incident 
In 2003, Romanowski attacked and injured one of his teammates, tight end Marcus Williams, during a scrimmage. Williams was forced to retire after Romanowski crushed his eye socket with the punch.

Williams sued for damages of $3.4 million, arguing that Romanowski had been suffering from "roid rage" when he attacked him. Williams was awarded $340,000 for lost wages and medical expenses by a jury. Williams was quoted as saying he and his lawyers "just wanted to prove what was right and wrong about football". Williams' attorney said he was very pleased with the verdict.

Racism allegations 
Romanowski has been accused of being racist at many points during his career and after retirement. Various media critics have pointed to his fines for actions including kicking Larry Centers in the head in 1995, spitting on San Francisco 49er receiver J.J. Stokes in 1997, and ripping Eddie George's helmet off in 2002, as evidence.

Romanowski called Carolina Panthers starting quarterback Cam Newton "boy" in a tweet after Newton's team lost in Super Bowl 50 and Newton conducted a very brief press interview. He later apologized after he was accused of being racist.

Post-NFL career
Romanowski co-authored an autobiography in 2005 titled Romo My Life on the Edge: Living Dreams and Slaying Dragons. The book became a New York Times best-selling book in 2005. It chronicles his childhood, college career, NFL career, living with post-concussion symptoms, nutrition, and recovery techniques used during his NFL playing career.

He was featured on the cover of the Midway Games title Blitz: The League and adds his voice as Bruno Battaglia, a linebacker in the game who wears his 53. He also appears in NCAA Football Series indirectly as LB #53 for the 1984 Boston College Eagles.

In 2006, he founded Nutrition53, a nutritional supplement company. He was also a minority owner of NASCAR's Swan Racing in 2013; Nutrition53 sponsored the team in 10 races that year.

Football 
In 2008, Romanowski was the defensive coordinator for the Piedmont High School (California) Highlanders Freshman Football team, where his son played.

In January 2009, Romanowski threw his name into the search for Mike Shanahan's replacement as the head coach of the Denver Broncos. Romanowski sent a 30-page PowerPoint presentation to team owner Pat Bowlen, but was not considered for the job. The job was ultimately given to Josh McDaniels.

BALCO Scandal
Romanowski and his wife were investigated for prescription drug fraud, though the charges were later dropped. Records seized by the government belonging to the Bay Area Laboratory Co-operative, later discovered to be the source of a designer steroid, indicate that he had used the anabolic steroid "The Clear" and synthetic testosterone ointment "The Cream" provided by BALCO since 2003. Romanowski admitted to staying a step ahead of NFL drug testing policies. In an October 16, 2005 appearance on 60 Minutes, Romanowski admitted to using steroids and human growth hormone that he received from Victor Conte, BALCO owner.

In media

References

External links

1966 births
Living people
People from Vernon, Connecticut
American Conference Pro Bowl players
American football linebackers
Boston College Eagles football players
Denver Broncos players
Doping cases in American football
American sportspeople in doping cases
Oakland Raiders players
People from Piedmont, California
People from Rockville, Connecticut
Philadelphia Eagles players
Violence in sports
San Francisco 49ers players
American people of Polish descent